James Brown Montgomery Jr. (March 18, 1922 – August 14, 1992) was an American football player. 

Born in Breckenridge, Texas, Montgomery attended Moran High School in Texas and played college football for Texas A&M. He played professional football in the National Football League (NFL) as a tackle for the Detroit Lions. He appeared in 11 NFL games during the 1946 season.

References

1922 births
1992 deaths
American football tackles
Texas A&M Aggies football players
Detroit Lions players
Players of American football from Texas
People from Breckenridge, Texas